Mega Web, or Megaweb, was a car theme park operated by Toyota in Odaiba's Palette Town, Tokyo, Japan. The Toyota City Showcase displays vehicles and has 1.3-km driving course for test driving. Ride Studio offers mini car driving and the Waku-Doki has simulated race track driving. The History Garage has a collection of 1950s–1970s models on display. Mega Web and the Historic Garage closed permanently on December 31, 2021, as part of Palette Town's anticipated redevelopment.

See also
 List of museums in Tokyo

References

External links

2021 disestablishments in Japan
Automobile museums in Japan
Museums in Tokyo
Odaiba
Toyota
Defunct museums in Japan